Annie Henry (25 July 1879–29 July 1971) was a New Zealand Presbyterian missionary who worked among the Maori people. She was born on 25 July 1879.

References 

1879 births
1971 deaths
New Zealand Presbyterian missionaries
Annie
Female Christian missionaries
Presbyterian missionaries in New Zealand